Žiganja Vas is a settlement in the Municipality of Tržič in the Upper Carniola region of Slovenia.

Church

The local church is dedicated to St. Ulrich. It was first mentioned in documents in 1327, and was extensively rebuilt in 1693 as indicated by the date above the portal. Fragments of frescos from the early 15th century survive in the church.

References

External links
Žiganja Vas at Geopedia

Populated places in the Municipality of Tržič